Tsetseng is a village in Kweneng District of Botswana. It is located in Kalahari Desert, 40 km north-east of Kang. The population was 395 in 2001 census. The Tsetseng population was 395 on November 16, 2010.

References

Kweneng District
Villages in Botswana